Juan Martín del Potro was the two-time defending champion, but withdrew because of a wrist injury.
Roger Federer won the title, defeating David Goffin in the final, 6–2, 6–2.

Seeds

 Roger Federer (champion)
 Rafael Nadal (quarterfinals)
 Stan Wawrinka (first round)
 Milos Raonic (quarterfinals)
 Grigor Dimitrov (quarterfinals)
 Ernests Gulbis (first round)
 David Goffin (final)
 Ivo Karlović (semifinals)

Draw

Finals

Top half

Bottom half

Qualifying

Seeds

 Jan-Lennard Struff (first round)
 Víctor Estrella Burgos (first round)
 Robin Haase (qualifying competition)
 Simone Bolelli (qualified)
 Paul-Henri Mathieu (qualifying competition, retired)
 Andreas Haider-Maurer (qualifying competition)
 Tatsuma Ito (first round)
 Marcos Baghdatis (first round)

Qualifiers

Qualifying draw

First qualifier

Second qualifier

Third qualifier

Fourth qualifier

References
 Main draw
 Qualifying draw

Swiss Indoors - Singles
2014 Davidoff Swiss Indoors